Robby Hoffman is an American-Canadian writer, comedian, and talk show host. Born in Brooklyn, New York, she began her career as a writer and is known for her work on The Chris Gethard Show, Baroness Von Sketch Show, Workin' Moms, and Odd Squad, the latter of which won a Children's & Family Emmy Award for outstanding writing in 2019. Hoffman released her first stand-up special, I'm Nervous, in 2019. She was named one of Comedy Central's Up Next comedians in 2018, appeared on Conan O'Brien's Comics to Watch list, as well as on Vulture's The Comedians You Should and Will Know in 2020.

Early life and education 
Hoffman was born in Brooklyn, New York and later raised by a single mother, the seventh of ten siblings in Montreal, Canada. She was raised Hasidic. She enrolled in school at McGill University, where she studied accounting and communications; after graduation, she enrolled in the graduate CPA program at McGill, only to quit a few hours into her first day of the program to pursue a career in comedy.

Career 
Hoffman began her writing career and was soon garnering recognition for her work, while also writing and performing stand-up comedy.  In 2018 she was a headlining act for the New York Comedy Festival. In 2019, she recorded her first one-hour comedy special I'm Nervous at the Just For Laughs comedy festival in Toronto for Crave TV. 

Hoffman's first television writing job was for the PBS series Odd Squad; she won a 2019 Daytime Emmy Award for her work on the series. Hoffman was a staff writer for Workin' Moms and Baroness Von Sketch Show. She was a staff writer on The Chris Gethard Show; after its cancellation, Hoffman starred in episodes of The Chris Gethard Show with Robby Hoffman on both MNN and Chris Gethard Presents, as well as taking the show live to the Montreal Just For Laughs festival. She hosted Robby Hoffman Consulting Group (formerly Dykevice), a live call-in advice show on Gethard's comedy network Planet Scum Live.

In 2021 it was announced that Rivkah, an autobiographical comedy series created by and starring Hoffman, is in development with Showtime and A24.

Personal life 
Hoffman is Jewish. She is queer.

Filmography

References

External links
 
 Official website

Living people
21st-century American comedians
21st-century American Jews
21st-century American women
21st-century Canadian comedians
21st-century Canadian Jews
21st-century Canadian women
American comedy writers
American stand-up comedians
American television writers
American women comedians
American women television writers
Canadian comedy writers
Canadian stand-up comedians
Canadian television writers
Canadian women comedians
Canadian women television writers
Comedians from New York City
Comedians from Montreal
Emmy Award winners
Jewish American comedians
Jewish Canadian comedians
Lesbian comedians
LGBT Jews
McGill University alumni
People from Brooklyn
Year of birth missing (living people)
Canadian LGBT comedians
American LGBT comedians
21st-century Canadian LGBT people